Marc Baró Ortiz (born 23 August 1999) is a Spanish footballer who plays as a left back for Cádiz CF B.

Club career
Born in Palma de Mallorca, Balearic Islands, Baró joined FC Barcelona's La Masia in June 2015, from lowly locals SD La Salle. In 2017, after a one-year loan at CF Damm, he joined Valencia CF and was assigned to the Juvenil A squad.

Baró made his senior debut with Valencia's reserves on 11 November 2017, starting in a 1–2 Segunda División B home loss against Hércules CF. On 31 January 2019, after failing to make the breakthrough, he moved to another reserve team, CF Peralada-Girona B also in the third division.

On 10 July 2019, Baró joined SD Leioa, still in the third division. The following 29 January, after being a regular starter, he agreed to a three-and-a-half-year contract with Cádiz CF, being initially assigned to the B-team in the same category.

In June 2020, Baró was called up to the main squad by manager Álvaro Cervera after the injury of Luismi Quezada, and made his professional debut on 17 July, starting in a 0–1 loss at Girona FC as his side was already promoted.

Baró made his La Liga debut on 23 January 2021, starting in a 0–3 loss at Sevilla FC. On 22 July, he moved to Real Betis' B-side in Primera División RFEF.

References

External links
 
 
 

1999 births
Living people
Footballers from Palma de Mallorca
Spanish footballers
Association football fullbacks
La Liga players
Segunda División players
Primera Federación players
Segunda División B players
CF Damm players
Valencia CF Mestalla footballers
CF Peralada players
SD Leioa players
Cádiz CF B players
Cádiz CF players
Betis Deportivo Balompié footballers